Veikune is a surname and Tongan hereditary title. Notable people with the surname include:

David Veikune (born 1985), American football player
Viliami Veasiʻi Veikune, Tongan noble and politician
Fatafehi Fuatakifolaha, Lord Veikune until 2006

Tongan-language surnames